XSC may refer to:
 Excitonic solar cell
 Sulfoacetaldehyde acetyltransferase, an enzyme
 South Caicos Airport
 Extensions for Scientific Computation, an extension for interval arithmetics